Kraussillichirus kraussi (Stebbing, 1900), commonly named the common sandprawn or pink prawn, is a species of ghost shrimp, an African crustacean in the family Callianassidae.

Distribution and habitat
This species occurs along the coast and estuaries from Lambert's Bay in the Western Cape, around the Cape and northwards along the Indian Ocean coastline to Delagoa Bay in Mozambique. It is well-adapted to life both in the littoral zone of sheltered marine bays and of estuaries.

Taxonomy
The common sandprawn was first described in the literature by the Rev. Thomas R. R. Stebbing, an ardent Darwinist who had been banned from preaching; the type specimen was collected at "Gordon's Bay, a little below high water mark", and placed in the genus Callianassa established by William Elford Leach in 1814. The species was subsequently moved to the genus Callichirus and, most recently, to the genus Kraussillichirus.

Description
The original description reads:

Ecology
Kraussillichirus kraussi plays an important role in the ecology of littoral zones by its bioturbation, which can alter sediment properties and thereby affect biofilms, microalgal and microbial levels, and meiobenthic and macrobenthic communities. Nutrients and bioturbation can also interact to shape macrofaunal communities. The distribution of these prawns is dictated by sediment properties which in turn are dependent on shore height and distance from the lagoon mouth. Collecting of the species as bait may reduce numbers significantly in some localities and disturb sedimentary environments.

A 2010 project in the Kasouga Estuary, on the south-eastern coast of South Africa, found that this species contributed significantly to bioturbation, leading to a decline in microphytobenthic algae which in turn caused a significant decrease in numbers of the gastropod Nassarius kraussianus. Another study in the Swartvlei estuary found that dense growth of the seagrass Zostera capensis and large numbers of burrowing bivalves led to a marked decrease in sandprawn numbers.

Cryptic species
DNA sequence data indicate that Kraussillichirus kraussi comprises between four and six distinct evolutionary lineages that may represent morphologically indistinguishable sister species. Their ranges are linked to southern African marine biogeographical provinces or the biogeographical transition zones that separate them, with the tropical lineage on the north-east coast being the most distinct.

Relationship with humans
The species is used as bait for commercial and recreational fishing, and is often harvested by suction with a prawn pump.

References

External links
 

Commercial crustaceans
Crustaceans of the Atlantic Ocean
Freshwater crustaceans
Crustaceans of South Africa
Thalassinidea
Crustaceans described in 1900